A straight-12 engine or inline-12 engine is a twelve-cylinder piston engine with all twelve cylinders mounted in a straight line along the crankcase.

Land use
Due to the very long length of a straight-twelve engine, they are rarely used in automobiles. The first known example is a  engine in the 1920 French Corona car; however it is not known if any were cars sold. Packard also experimented with an automobile powered by an inline 12 in 1929.

The straight-12 has also been used for large military trucks.

Marine use
Some Russian firms built straight-12s for use in ships in the 1960s and 1970s.

MAN Diesel & Turbo 12K98ME and 12S90ME-C and the Wärtsilä-Sulzer RTA96-C are examples of contemporary marine engines in L-12-cylinder configuration. These are popular for propulsion in container ships.

References

Piston engine configurations
12-cylinder engines
12